Storløkken is a Norwegian surname. Notable people with the surname include:

 Lene Storløkken (born 1981), Norwegian footballer
 Ståle Storløkken (born 1969), Norwegian jazz musician and composer

Norwegian-language surnames